The Venerable William Claybrook was a priest in England during the  16th-century.

Claybrook was  educated at the University of Oxford. He was the Rector of All Hallows, Lombard Street in the City of London. He was Archdeacon of Worcester from 15631 until 1534.

Notes 

Alumni of the University of Oxford
16th-century English people
Archdeacons of Worcester